Leonard Marchant RE (October 23, 1929 – January 9, 2000) was a painter and printmaker, particularly admired as a master of the mezzotint.

Early life 
Marchant was born at Cape Town, South Africa, the second son of Kathleen (née Cunningham) and Henry Marchant.  His father died while on active service in the Second World War, when Marchant was 15; and he and his siblings were brought up by his devout Catholic mother, grandmother and aunts.

As a teenager he taught himself to paint; and in 1950, at the age of 19, was given a solo exhibition at the Argus Gallery in Cape Town, South Africa.

In 1950, Marchant worked his passage on a merchant ship and arrived in London with little money and no contacts. He was not eligible for a grant to study in the UK. He telephoned Jacob Epstein out of the blue and visited him with a portfolio of drawings and paintings. Epstein was encouraging and gave him a letter of recommendation to the British Council, which provided a grant to allow him to study for three months at the Saint Martin's School of Art.

In London Marchant met and married Teressa Trapler. Forced by financial and political constraints to return to South Africa, they finally moved permanently to the UK three years later, in 1956; and in 1959 Marchant received a grant to study full time at the Central School of Arts and Crafts.

Career 
During his studies at the Central School for Arts and Crafts, Marchant saw the mezzotints of Yōzō Hamaguchi, a Japanese artist then living in Paris. During this time, Marchant discovered a mezzotint rocker and rocking pole in a cupboard at the school. “No one knew how to do it any longer so I had to teach myself," he later wrote, “it was an incredibly laborious process. What really appealed to me was the superb richness of the tone”.

Although Marchant continued to paint throughout his life, he was best known for his mezzotints. “With his mezzotints, he touched greatness… Marchant was a master, his needle scratched in the darkness; a candle, a bowl, a cup and saucer gleamed forth.” Liese Van Der Watt said that “Marchant is credited with the revival of this old craft in the (19)60s, especially in Britain.” and "the paintings show the same narrow repetition of a single class of subject, as if the artist's concern is more with technique and medium and with the ojects that are portrayed. But something else has crept into these oils - a sense of purposeful naivety, of magic realism that reminds one vaguely and unexpectedly of the works of Frida Kahlo".

In 1986 Marchant was elected a fellow of the Royal Society of Painter-Printmakers, with whom he exhibited regularly.

In 1963 Marchant joined the staff of the Central School of Arts and Crafts in the Fine Art Etching department where he stayed until 1983. In later years he travelled to other art schools including Royal, Slade, Chelsea, Morley and Winchester, to demonstrate the mezzotint process and illustrate this with his own work.

Later life 
After retiring from teaching, Marchant and his wife moved to Shropshire, where he continued to work both on mezzotints and painting. His final solo show was held at the London Bankside Gallery in 1998.

Awards 
1970 – Stet prize, Florence Biennale.
1975 – Grocers Fellowship, British School at Rome, Rome.
1986 – Christie's Contemporary Art Prize – Best print in Royal Society of Painters Etchers and Engravers Exhibition.
1987 - CCA Galleries, PLC Award.
1998 – Purcell Paper Prize, National Print Exchange, Mall Gallery.

Collections
Bowdoin College Museum of Art
British Council
Davison Art Center, Wesleyan University
Museum Folkwang, Essen
South African National Gallery
University of the Arts London
University of Michigan Museum of Art
Victoria and Albert Museum, London

Solo exhibitions 
1950 − Argus Gallery, Cape Town, South Africa
1998 − Retrospective 1948–1998, Bankside Gallery, London

References 

1929 births
2000 deaths
20th-century British painters
20th-century British printmakers
20th-century South African painters
Alumni of Saint Martin's School of Art
Academics of the Central School of Art and Design
South African academics
South African expatriates in the United Kingdom
South African printmakers